NGC 1624, also known as Sh2-212 in the Sharpless catalog, is a very young open cluster in the constellation Perseus inside an emission nebula. It was discovered by German-British astronomer William Herschel in 1790. NGC 1624 is about 20,000 ly (6,000 pc) from Earth, and latest estimates give it an age of less than 4 million years. Its apparent magnitude is 11.8, and apparent diameter is about 3.0 arc minutes. Its celestial location is right ascension (α)  and declination (δ) .
It is potentially an area of massive star formation.

According to Robert Trumpler's classification of open clusters, this cluster contains fewer than 50 stars (letter p) with a high concentration (I) and whose magnitudes are distributed over an average interval (number 2). The letter n at the end (I2pn) means that the cluster is inside a nebula.

Along with nearby emission nebula Sh2-211 it makes up what has become known as the Tribble Nebulae, so called because they look like the furry creatures first introduced in the Star Trek episode "The Trouble with Tribbles".

References

External links 
 

NGC 1624 spider.seds.org
NGC 1624 
Sh2-211
Sh2-212

Open clusters
Perseus (constellation)
1624